SMS  was the lead ship of the s of the German Imperial Navy, named after the 19th-century German Field Marshal Helmuth von Moltke. Commissioned on 30 September 1911, the ship was the second battlecruiser of the Imperial Navy. , along with her sister ship , was an enlarged version of the previous German battlecruiser design, with increased armor protection and two more main guns in an additional turret. Compared to her British rivals—the — and her sister  were significantly larger and better armored.

The ship participated in most of the major fleet actions conducted by the German Navy during the First World War, including the Battles of Dogger Bank and Jutland in the North Sea in 1915 and 1916, respectively. She also took part in the Battle of the Gulf of Riga in 1915 and Operation Albion in 1917 in the Baltic.  was damaged several times during the war: the ship was hit by heavy-caliber gunfire at Jutland, and torpedoed twice by British submarines while on fleet advances.

Following the end of the war in 1918, along with most of the High Seas Fleet, was interned at Scapa Flow pending a decision by the Allies as to the fate of the fleet. The ship met her end when she was scuttled, along with the rest of the High Seas Fleet in 1919 to prevent them from falling into Allied hands.

Design 

Her crew consisted on 43 officers and 1,010 enlisted men.

The ship was armed with a main battery of ten  SK L/50 guns mounted in five twin-gun turrets; of these, one was placed forward, two were en echelon amidships, and the other two were in a superfiring pair aft. Her secondary armament consisted of twelve  SK L/45 guns placed in individual casemates in the central portion of the ship and twelve  SK L/45 guns, also in individual mounts in the bow, the stern, and around the forward conning tower. She was also equipped with four  submerged torpedo tubes, one in the bow, one in the stern, and one on each broadside.

The ship's armor consisted of Krupp cemented steel. The main battery gun turrets had  faces, and they sat atop barbettes that were equally thick.

Service history

Pre-war 

The contract for "Cruiser G" was awarded on 17 September 1908, and the keel was laid on 23 January 1909. Her launching was scheduled for 22 March 1910, but work was delayed somewhat and the ceremony took place on 7 April 1910. At the launching of the ship on 7 April 1910, Helmuth von Moltke the Younger christened her after his uncle, Helmuth von Moltke the Elder, the chief of staff of the Prussian and later German General Staff during the wars of German unification. On 11 September 1911, a crew composed of dockyard workers transferred the ship from Hamburg to Kiel through the Skagerrak. She thereafter began sea trials, and though she had not yet formally entered service, the ship joined I Scouting Group, the fleet's main reconnaissance force. There she replaced the armored cruiser , which had been decommissioned on 22 September. In early November, the ships of I SG conducted a training cruise in the Kattegat; a serious storm forced  to shelter in Uddevalla, Sweden, from 3 to 6 November. She spent the next several months completing her trials in the Danziger Bucht, and on 1 April 1912 the ship was pronounced ready for service.

The navy had intended  to become the flagship of I SG upon entering active service, but she instead received orders for a special voyage. In mid-1911, an American squadron had visited Kiel, and the Germans wanted to reciprocate by sending a group of German vessels to the United States. On 11 May, the two ships left Kiel, passed through the Canary Islands, and arrived off Cape Henry, Virginia, on 30 May, where  joined them. The three ships then entered Hampton Roads on 3 June; the President of the United States, William Howard Taft, received the ships aboard the presidential yacht . Also present was a contingent from the Atlantic Fleet. On 8–9 June, the ships sailed to New York City, where the crews were well-received by both local German clubs and the upper class. The ships departed New York on 13 June,  sailing for Baltimore while  and  returned to Kiel. They arrived there on 24 June, and the following day, the cruiser squadron was dissolved.  was the only German capital ship to ever visit the United States.

In July 1912,  escorted Kaiser Wilhelm II's yacht  to Russia to meet Czar Nicholas II. The voyage lasted from 4 to 6 July. The ships took part in the annual fleet maneuvers held in August and September, which concluded with a naval review for Kaiser Wilhelm II in the German Bight. On 19 September,  was awarded the Kaiser's  (Shooting Prize) for large cruisers.  visited Malmö, Sweden, and took part in training exercises later that year. In December, the ship was dry docked in Wilhelmshaven for periodic maintenance that lasted until February 1913.

Upon returning to service, the ship took part in squadron and fleet training exercises in the KAttegat and the North Sea in February and March. By that time,  and the new light cruiser  had been sent to the Mediterranean Sea in response to the First Balkan War,  was out of service for maintenance,  had been decommissioned, and the new battlecruiser  had not yet commissioned, leaving I SG under strength for the fleet maneuvers scheduled for May. The large armored cruiser , then serving as the artillery school training ship, was temporarily assigned to I SG to make up the shortfall. Following the maneuvers, the unit cruised with the rest of the High Seas Fleet from 15 July to 10 August, which included a lengthy visit to Norway. During this period,  visited Lærdalsøyri, Norway, from 27 July to 3 August. After the unit returned home,  joined it on 17 August. KAdm Franz Hipper replaced Bachmann as the unit commander on 30 September, though he did not arrive aboard the ship until 15 October, as he had been on vacation at the time.

In November,  was present for fleet exercises in the Baltic Sea. The ships of I SG conducted unit maneuvers in February 1914 in the North and Baltic Seas. In late March, the fleet assembled for another period of training exercises that lasted  into early May. There was some consideration given to deploying  to the Far East in order to replace the armored cruiser , but the plan was abandoned when it became apparent that  needed a major overhaul and would need to be replaced in the Mediterranean.  was then scheduled to transfer to replace her sister ship, but this plan was interrupted by the outbreak of World War I in July.

World War I

Battle of Heligoland Bight 

Shortly after the outbreak of World War I, on 28 August 1914,  participated in the Battle of Heligoland Bight. During the morning, British cruisers from the Harwich Force attacked the German destroyers patrolling the Heligoland Bight. Six German light cruisers—, and —responded to the attack and inflicted serious damage to the British raiders. However, the arrival at approximately 13:37 of the British 1st Battlecruiser Squadron, under the command of Vice Admiral David Beatty, quickly put the German ships at a disadvantage.

Along with the rest of the I Scouting Group battlecruisers,  was stationed in the Wilhelmshaven Roads on the morning of the battle. At 14:25, the remaining light cruisers—, and —rendezvoused with the battlecruisers.  arrived on the scene by 15:10, while  succumbed to battle damage and sank. By 16:00, the German flotilla turned around to return to the Jade Estuary, arriving at approximately 20:23.

Bombardment of Yarmouth 

The flotilla arrived off Great Yarmouth at daybreak the following morning and bombarded the port, while the light cruiser  laid a minefield. Shortly thereafter, Hipper ordered his ships to turn back to German waters. However, while Hipper's ships were returning to German waters, a heavy fog covered the Heligoland Bight, so the ships were ordered to halt until visibility improved so they could safely navigate the defensive minefields.  left the Jade without permission, and while en route to Wilhelmshaven made a navigational error that led the ship into one of the German minefields.  struck two mines and quickly sank; the coastal defense ship  was able to save 127 men of the crew.

Bombardment of Scarborough, Hartlepool, and Whitby 

It was decided by Ingenohl that another raid on the English coast was to be carried out, in the hopes of luring a portion of the Grand Fleet into combat, where it could be destroyed. The ships sailed north past the island of Heligoland, until they reached the Horns Reef lighthouse, at which point the ships turned west towards Scarborough. Twelve hours after Hipper left the Jade, the High Seas Fleet, consisting of 14 dreadnoughts and 8 pre-dreadnoughts and a screening force of 2 armored cruisers, 7 light cruisers, and 54 torpedo boats, departed to provide distant cover.

On 26 August 1914, the German light cruiser  had run aground in the Gulf of Finland; the wreck was captured by the Russian navy, which found codebooks used by the German navy, along with navigational charts for the North Sea. These documents were then passed on to the Royal Navy. Room 40 began decrypting German signals, and on 14 December, intercepted messages relating to the plan to bombard Scarborough. However, the exact details of the plan were unknown, and it was assumed that the High Seas Fleet would remain safely in port, as in the previous bombardment. Beatty's four battlecruisers, supported by the 3rd Cruiser Squadron and the 1st Light Cruiser Squadron, along with the 2nd Battle Squadron's six dreadnoughts, were to ambush Hipper's battlecruisers.

During the night of 15 December, the main body of the High Seas Fleet encountered British destroyers. Fearing the prospect of a nighttime torpedo attack, Ingenohl ordered the ships to retreat. Hipper was unaware of Ingenohl's reversal, and so he continued with the bombardment. Upon reaching the British coast, Hipper's battlecruisers split into two groups. During the bombardment of Hartlepool,  was struck by a  shell from a coastal battery, which caused minor damage between decks, but no casualties.  was hit six times and  three times by the coastal battery. By 09:45 on the 16th, the two groups had reassembled, and they began to retreat eastward.

By this time, Beatty's battlecruisers were in position to block Hipper's chosen egress route, while other forces were en route to complete the encirclement. At 12:25, the light cruisers of II Scouting Group began to pass through the British forces searching for Hipper. One of the cruisers in the 2nd Light Cruiser Squadron spotted  and signaled a report to Beatty. At 12:30, Beatty turned his battlecruisers towards the German ships. Beatty presumed that the German cruisers were the advance screen for Hipper's ships, however those were some  ahead. The 2nd Light Cruiser Squadron, which had been screening for Beatty's ships, detached to pursue the German cruisers, but a misinterpreted signal from the British battlecruisers sent them back to their screening positions. This confusion allowed the German light cruisers to escape and alerted Hipper to the location of the British battlecruisers. The German battlecruisers wheeled to the northeast of the British forces and made good their escape.

Both the British and the Germans were disappointed that they failed to effectively engage their opponents. Ingenohl's reputation suffered greatly as a result of his timidity. The official German history criticized Ingenohl for failing to use his light forces to determine the size of the British fleet, stating: "he decided on a measure which not only seriously jeopardized his advance forces off the English coast but also deprived the German Fleet of a signal and certain victory."

Battle of Dogger Bank 

In early January 1915, it became known that British ships were conducting reconnaissance in the Dogger Bank area. Ingenohl was initially reluctant to destroy these forces, because I Scouting Group was temporarily weakened while  was in drydock for periodic maintenance. However, KAdm Richard Eckermann, the Chief of Staff of the High Seas Fleet, insisted on the operation, and so Ingenohl relented and ordered Hipper to take his battlecruisers to the Dogger Bank.

Each light cruiser had a half-flotilla of torpedo boats attached.

Again, interception and decryption of German wireless signals played an important role. Although they were unaware of the exact plans, the cryptographers of Room 40 were able to deduce that Hipper would be conducting an operation in the Dogger Bank area.

At 08:14,  spotted the light cruiser  and several destroyers from the Harwich Force. Aurora challenged  with a searchlight, at which point  attacked Aurora and scored two hits. Hipper immediately turned his battlecruisers towards the gunfire, when, almost simultaneously,  spotted a large amount of smoke to the northwest of her position. This was identified as a number of large British warships steaming towards Hipper's ships.

Two minutes later, the German ships began returning fire, primarily concentrating on Lion, from a range of 18,000 yards (15,460 m). At 10:28, Lion was struck on the waterline, which tore a hole in the side of the ship and flooded a coal bunker. By 10:35, the range had closed to 17,500 yards (16,000 m), at which point the entire German line was within the effective range of the British ships. Beatty ordered his battlecruisers to engage their German counterparts.

At 10:40, one of Lions  shells struck  causing nearly catastrophic damage that knocked out both of the rear turrets and killed 159 men. Disaster was averted when the executive officer ordered the flooding of both magazines to avoid a flash fire that would have destroyed the ship. By this time, the German battlecruisers had zeroed in on Lion and began scoring repeated hits. At 11:01, an  shell from  struck Lion and knocked out two of her dynamos. This shell eventually crippled Lion by forcing the ship to turn off its engines because of seawater contamination.

By this time,  was severely damaged after having been pounded by heavy shells. However, the chase ended when there were several reports of U-boats ahead of the British ships; Beatty quickly ordered evasive maneuvers, which allowed the German ships to increase the distance from their pursuers. At this time, Lions last operational dynamo failed, which dropped her speed to 15 knots. By the time Beatty regained control over his ships, after having boarded Princess Royal, the German ships had too far a lead for the British to catch them; at 13:50, he broke off the chase.

Battle of the Gulf of Riga 

On 3 August 1915,  was transferred to the Baltic with I Reconnaissance Group (AG) to participate in the foray into the Riga Gulf. The intention was to destroy the Russian naval forces in the area, including the pre-dreadnought , and to use the minelayer  to block the entrance to Moon Sound with naval mines.

On 8 August, the first attempt to clear the gulf was made; the old battleships  and  kept  at bay while minesweepers cleared a path through the inner belt of mines. During this period, the rest of the German fleet remained in the Baltic and provided protection against other units of the Russian fleet. However, the approach of nightfall meant that  would be unable to mine the entrance to Moon Sound in time, and so the operation was broken off.

On 16 August, a second attempt was made to enter the gulf. After three days, the Russian minefields had been cleared, and the flotilla entered the gulf on 19 August, but reports of Allied submarines in the area prompted a German withdrawal from the gulf the following day.

Throughout the operation,  remained in the Baltic and provided cover for the assault into the Gulf of Riga. On the morning of the 19th,  was torpedoed by the British E-class submarine . The torpedo was not spotted until it was approximately 200 yards (183 m) away; without time to maneuver, the ship was struck in the bow torpedo room. The explosion damaged several torpedoes in the ship, but they did not detonate themselves. The ship was repaired at Blohm & Voss in Hamburg, between 23 August and 20 September. In January 1916, KzS Johannes von Karpf relieved Levetzow as the ship's commander.

Bombardment of Yarmouth and Lowestoft 

 also took part in the bombardment of Yarmouth and Lowestoft on 24–25 April. Hipper was away on sick leave, so the German ships were under the command of KAdm Friedrich Boedicker. The heavy units of the High Seas Fleet sailed at 13:40, with the objective to provide distant support for Boedicker's ships. The British Admiralty was made aware of the German sortie through the interception of German wireless signals, and deployed the Grand Fleet at 15:50.

By 14:00, Boedicker's ships had reached a position off Norderney, at which point he turned his ships northward to avoid the Dutch observers on the island of Terschelling. The four remaining battlecruisers turned south immediately in the direction of Norderney to avoid further mine damage. By 16:00,  was clear of imminent danger, so the ship stopped to allow Boedicker to disembark.

Boedicker refused to be distracted by the British ships, and instead trained his ships' guns on Lowestoft. The German battlecruisers destroyed two 6 in (15 cm) shore batteries and inflicted other damage to the town. In the process, a single 6 in shell from one of the shore batteries struck , but the ship sustained no significant damage.

At 05:20, the German raiders turned north, towards Yarmouth, which they reached by 05:42. The German ships turned back south, and at 05:47 encountered for the second time the Harwich Force, which had by then been engaged by the six light cruisers of the screening force. Boedicker's ships opened fire from a range of 13,000 yards (12,000 m). Tyrwhitt immediately turned his ships around and fled south, but not before the cruiser  sustained severe damage. Due to reports of British submarines and torpedo attacks, Boedicker broke off the chase and turned back east towards the High Seas Fleet. At this point, Scheer, who had been warned of the Grand Fleet's sortie from Scapa Flow, turned back towards Germany.

Battle of Jutland 

, and the rest of Hipper's battlecruisers in I Scouting Group, lay anchored in the outer Jade Roads on the night of 30 May 1916.

An hour and a half later, the High Seas Fleet under the command of Admiral Reinhard Scheer left the Jade; the force was composed of 16 dreadnoughts. The six pre-dreadnoughts of II Battle Squadron had departed from the Elbe roads at 02:45, and rendezvoused with the battle fleet at 5:00.

Run to the south

Shortly before 16:00, Hipper's force encountered Beatty's battlecruiser squadron. The German ships were the first to open fire, at a range of approximately 15,000 yards (14,000 m). When the British ships began returning fire, confusion amongst the British battlecruisers resulted in  being engaged by both New Zealand and Tiger. The British rangefinders had misread the range to their German targets, and so the first salvos fired by the British ships fell a mile past the German battlecruisers. At 16:52,  hit Tiger with two main gun shells, but neither of these hits caused any significant damage.  then fired a further four shells, two of which hit simultaneously on the midships and after turrets, knocking both out for a significant period of the battle.

This caused the British line to fall into disarray, as the torpedoes were thought to have been fired by U-boats. At this point, Hipper's battlecruisers had come into range of the V Battle Squadron, composed of the new s, which mounted powerful  guns. At 17:16, one of the 15 in shells from the fast battleships struck , where it pierced a coal bunker, tore into a casemate deck, and ignited ammunition stored therein. The explosion burned the ammunition hoist down to the magazine.

 and  changed their speed and direction, which threw off the aim of the V Battle Squadron and earned the battered ships a short respite.

Battlefleets engage

By 19:30, the High Seas Fleet, which was by that point pursuing the British battlecruisers, had not yet encountered the Grand Fleet. Scheer had been considering retiring his forces before darkness exposed his ships to torpedo boat attack. However, he had not yet made a decision when his leading battleships encountered the main body of the Grand Fleet. This development made it impossible for Scheer to retreat, for doing so would have sacrificed the slower pre-dreadnought battleships of II Battle Squadron, while using his dreadnoughts and battlecruisers to cover their retreat would have subjected his strongest ships to overwhelming British fire. Instead, Scheer ordered his ships to turn 16 points to starboard, which would bring the pre-dreadnoughts to the relative safety of the disengaged side of the German battle line.

Hipper's badly battered ships gained a temporary moment of respite, and uncertainty over the exact location and course of Scheer's ships led Admiral John Jellicoe to turn his ships eastward, towards what he thought was the likely path of the German retreat. The German fleet was instead sailing west, but Scheer ordered a second 16-point turn, which reversed course and pointed his ships at the center of the British fleet. However, three minutes later, the German battlecruisers turned in retreat, covered by a torpedo boat attack.

Withdrawal

A pause in the battle at dusk allowed  and the other German battlecruisers to cut away wreckage that interfered with the main guns, extinguish fires, repair the fire control and signal equipment, and ready the searchlights for nighttime action. During this period, the German fleet reorganized into a well-ordered formation in reverse order, when the German light forces encountered the British screen shortly after 21:00. The renewed gunfire gained Beatty's attention, so he turned his battlecruisers westward. At 21:09, he sighted the German battlecruisers, and drew to within  before opening fire at 20:20. The attack from the British battlecruisers completely surprised Hipper, who had been in the process of boarding  from the torpedo boat . The German ships returned fire with every gun available, and at 21:32 hit both Lion and Princess Royal in the darkness. The maneuvering of the German battlecruisers forced the leading I Battle Squadron to turn westward to avoid collision. This brought the pre-dreadnoughts of II Battle Squadron directly behind the battlecruisers, and prevented the British ships from pursuing the German battlecruisers when they turned southward. The British battlecruisers opened fire on the old battleships; the German ships turned southwest to bring all of their guns to bear against the British ships.

However, nearly simultaneously, the heavily damaged British cruisers broke off the attack. As the light cruisers were disengaging, a torpedo fired by  struck , and the ship exploded.

By 23:30 on her own,  encountered four British dreadnoughts, from the rear division of the 2nd Battle Squadron. Karpf ordered the ship to swing away, hoping he had not been detected. The British ships in fact had seen , but had decided to not open fire in order to not reveal their location to the entire German fleet. At 23:55, and again at 00:20, Karpf tried to find a path through the British fleet, but both times was unable to do so. It was not until 01:00, after having steamed far ahead of the Grand Fleet, that  was able to make good her escape.

Close to the end of the battle, at 03:55, Hipper transmitted a report to Scheer informing him of the tremendous damage his ships had suffered. Hipper reported: "I Scouting Group was therefore no longer of any value for a serious engagement, and was consequently directed to return to harbour by the Commander-in-Chief, while he himself determined to await developments off Horns Reef with the battlefleet."

During the course of the battle,  had hit Tiger 13 times, and was hit herself 4 times, all by  shells. The No. 5 starboard 15 cm gun was struck by one of the 15 in shells and put out of action for the remainder of the battle. The ship suffered 16 dead and 20 wounded, the majority of which were due to the hit on the 15 cm gun. Flooding and counter-flooding efforts caused 1,000 tons of water to enter the ship.

Later operations 
The ship thereafter conducted training exercises in the Baltic before being pronounced for active service on 14 August. Four days later, she took part in the fleet advance on 18–19 August During the operation, I Scouting Group was to bombard the coastal town of Sunderland in an attempt to draw out and destroy Beatty's battlecruisers. Scheer and the rest of the High Seas Fleet, with 15 dreadnoughts of its own, would trail behind and provide cover. The British were aware of the German plans and sortied the Grand Fleet to meet them. By 14:35, Scheer had been warned of the Grand Fleet's approach and, unwilling to engage the whole of the Grand Fleet just 11 weeks after the decidedly close call at Jutland, turned his forces around and retreated to German ports.

In September 1916, Karpf left  and KzS Hans Gygas assumed command of the ship, and remained her captain through the end of the war.  took part in another operation in the North Sea on 25–26 September, still with Hipper aboard. She and the rest of I SG served as the covering force for a sweep by II Scouting Group in the direction of Terschelling. On 20 October, Hipper departed the ship. Between September and October 1917, the ship took part in Operation Albion supporting the German invasion of the Russian islands of Ösel, Dagö, and Moon (in present-day Estonia). Following the successful operation in the Baltic,  was detached to support II Scouting Group (II AG), but did not actively participate in the Second Battle of Heligoland Bight.

Late 1917 saw the High Seas Fleet beginning to conduct anti-convoy raids in the North Sea between Britain and Norway. In October and December 1917, two British convoys to Norway were intercepted and destroyed by German cruisers and destroyers, prompting Beatty, now the Commander in Chief of the Grand Fleet, to detach several battleships and battlecruisers to protect convoys. This presented to Scheer the opportunity for which he had been waiting the entire war: the chance to isolate and eliminate a portion of the Grand Fleet.

At 05:00 on 23 April 1918, the High Seas Fleet left harbor with the intention of intercepting one of the heavily escorted convoys. Wireless radio traffic was kept to a minimum to prevent the British from learning of the operation. At 05:10 on 24 April,  suffered machinery failure: the starboard propeller had fallen off the shaft, and before the turbine could be stopped, a gear wheel was destroyed. The destroyed wheel flung pieces of steel into an auxiliary condenser, which flooded the engine room and stopped the operation of the center and starboard engines. Saltwater entered the boilers, reducing the ship's speed to a mere four knots; by 08:45, the captain of  reported to Scheer that his ship was "out of control", and that the ship would need to be towed. At 09:38, the cruiser  attempted to take the ship under tow, but was unable to do so. At 10:13, the dreadnought  was detached from the battle fleet to tow  back to port. At 14:10, the convoy had still not yet been located, and so Scheer turned the High Seas Fleet back towards German waters. By 17:10, s engines had been repaired, and the ship was able to steam at a speed of 17 knots. At 19:37, the British submarine  spotted the ship and fired a torpedo into . The ship took in 1,800 tons of water, but was able to reach harbor under her own power. Repairs were carried out in Wilhelmshaven in the Imperial Dockyard, between 30 April and 9 September 1918.

Following repairs,  took part in training operations in the Baltic from 19 September to 3 October. Starting on 1 November, the ship served as I Scouting Group flagship for Reuter, after the battlecruiser  had gone into dry dock for repairs.

Fate 

However, while the fleet was consolidating in Wilhelmshaven, war-weary sailors began deserting en masse. As  and  passed through the locks that separated Wilhelmshaven's inner harbor and roadstead, some 300 men from both ships climbed over the side and disappeared ashore.

On 24 October 1918, the order was given to sail from Wilhelmshaven. The order to sail was rescinded in the face of this open revolt. In early November 1918, the German Revolution began; it led to the Armistice that ended the war and it toppled the monarchy.

 was surrendered with the rest of the High Seas Fleet on 24 November 1918 and interned at Scapa Flow, under the command of  Wollante. Believing that the Treaty of Versailles had been signed and his fleet was about to be seized by the British, Reuter ordered the scuttling of the High Seas Fleet on 21 June 1919, while the British Grand Fleet was away on exercises. The ship sank in two hours and fifteen minutes.  was raised in 1927 and scrapped at Rosyth in 1929.

Notes

Footnotes

Citations

References

Further reading
 
 
 

Moltke-class battlecruisers
Ships built in Hamburg
World War I battlecruisers of Germany
1910 ships
World War I warships scuttled at Scapa Flow
Maritime incidents in 1919